Joseph Richmond Levenson (June 10, 1920 – April 6, 1969) was a scholar of Chinese history and Jane K. Sather Professor of History at the University of California, Berkeley.

After graduating from Boston Latin School in 1937 and Harvard College in 1941, Levenson enlisted in the United States Navy in 1942. He attended Japanese Language School and saw active service in the Solomon Islands and Philippines campaigns. After the war he earned M.A. (1947) and PhD (1949) degrees at Harvard, where he was a student of John K. Fairbank. He was a member of the Harvard Society of Fellows. He taught at the University of California, Berkeley, from 1951 until his death. He drowned in a canoeing accident in the Russian River, California, in 1969.

Honors and awards
Levenson earned a number of awards and prizes, including Fulbright (1954–55), the Center for Advanced Study in the Behavioral Sciences (1958–59); Guggenheim (1962–63); and the American Council of Learned Societies (1966–67).

In honor of his scholarly and pedagogical contributions, two awards are made in his name: the China and Inner Asia Council of the Association for Asian Studies offers the Joseph Levenson Book Prize and one by Harvard University for excellence in undergraduate teaching.

Intellectual achievements
Paul Cohen commented in his study of American historical writing on China, Discovering History in China, that Levenson addressed "the issues of modernization and cultural change more persistently, imaginatively, and, for many of his readers, persuasively than perhaps any other American historian of China in the immediate postwar decades".

Notes

References and further reading
 
 James Cahill, "Joseph Levenson's Role In My Development As A Scholar And Writer."
 Paul Cohen, Joseph Levenson and the Historiography of the 1950s and 1960s, in 
 

 
 
 Henry F. May, H. Franz Schurmann, Frederic Wakeman, "Joseph Richmond Levenson, History, Berkeley," (Necrology) Calisphere University of California.
 
 Don J. Wyatt, Joseph Richmond Levenson, International Directory of Intellectual Historians.

Selected works

Articles and chapters
 "The Humanistic Disciplines: Will Sinology Do?," The Journal of Asian Studies 23.04  (1964):  507–512.

Books
 Liang Ch'i-ch'ao and the Mind of Modern China (1953)
 Confucian China and Its Modern Fate (1958-1965)
 China: an interpretive history, from the beginnings to the fall of Han (1969)
 Revolution and Cosmopolitanism: the Western stage and the Chinese stages (1971)

External links
 Guide to the Joseph Richmond Levenson Papers at The Bancroft Library

1920 births
1969 deaths
Harvard College alumni
20th-century American historians
American male non-fiction writers
American sinologists
Boston Latin School alumni
20th-century American male writers
United States Navy personnel of World War II